Sodium hexachloroplatinate(IV), the sodium salt of chloroplatinic acid, is an inorganic compound with the formula Na2[PtCl6], consisting of the sodium cation and the hexachloroplatinate anion. As explained by Cox and Peters, anhydrous sodium hexachloroplatinate, which is yellow, tends to form the orange hexahydrate upon storage in humid air. The latter can be dehydrated upon heating at 110 °C.

The compound is utilised as the most common chemical shift reference in platinum-195 NMR spectroscopy, relative to which the shifts of other platinum species in solution are reported.

Preparation and reactions
Sodium hexachloroplatinate is obtained as an intermediate in the preparation of Pt complexes, often starting with the dissolution of platinum in aqua regia, giving hexachloroplatinic acid, which is then reacted with sodium chloride and evaporated, leaving the salt behind.

Pt + 4 HNO3 + 6 HCl → H2[PtCl6] + 4 NO2 + 4 H2O
H2[PtCl6] + NaCl → Na2[PtCl6] + 2 HCl
The compound can be converted back to platinum metal via conversion to the ammonium salt followed by thermal decomposition, allowing platinum metal to be recovered from laboratory residues.
Na2[PtCl6] + 2 NH4Cl → (NH4)2[PtCl6] + 2 NaCl
3 (NH4)2[PtCl6] → 3 Pt + 2 N2 + 2 NH4Cl + 16 HCl

This compound also reacts with a base, such as sodium hydroxide, producing [Pt(OH)6]−2 ion.

Applications 
A 1.2 M solution of sodium hexachloroplatinate in D2O is the most commonly chosen reference compound for chemical shifts in 195Pt NMR. The salt is chosen as it is commercially available at a lower price relative to other platinum compounds, and it possesses high solubility enabling quick acquisition of spectra.

References

Platinum(IV) compounds
Sodium compounds
Chloro complexes
Hexachloroplatinates